Fresh Water is a Canadian documentary film, directed by David Kalinauskas and released in 2021. The film is a portrait of Antonio Lennert, a gay surfer from Brazil who moved to Toronto after marrying a Canadian partner, and became the owner of the Surf the Greats surf shop and a participant in the city's thriving subculture of freshwater surfers who ride the waves of Lake Ontario when they rise in bad weather.

The film premiered July 5, 2021 on Crave.

The film was a Canadian Screen Award nominee for Best Documentary Program at the 10th Canadian Screen Awards in 2022.

References

External links
 

2021 films
2021 documentary films
2021 LGBT-related films
Canadian documentary television films
Canadian LGBT-related television films
Documentary films about gay men
Documentary films about LGBT sportspeople
Crave original programming
Documentary films about surfing
Canadian sports documentary films
2020s Canadian films